Miguel Roca (born 21 April 1955) is a Spanish fencer. He competed in the individual foil event at the 1980 Summer Olympics.

References

External links
 

1955 births
Living people
Spanish male foil fencers
Olympic fencers of Spain
Fencers at the 1980 Summer Olympics
Sportspeople from Barcelona